Estromustine (developmental code name Leo 271 f), also known as estrone 17β-3-N-bis(2-chloroethyl)carbamate or estrone–cytostatic complex, is a major active metabolite of the cytostatic antineoplastic agent and estrogen estramustine phosphate, a medication used in the treatment of prostate cancer.

See also
 List of hormonal cytostatic antineoplastic agents
 List of estrogen esters § Estradiol esters

References

Abandoned drugs
Antiandrogens
Antigonadotropins
Antineoplastic drugs
Carbamates
Chloroethyl compounds
Estradiol esters
Estranes
Estrogens
Human drug metabolites
Ketones
Mitotic inhibitors
Nitrogen mustards
Organochlorides
Phenol esters